A. arvensis may refer to:

An abbreviation of a species name. In binomial nomenclature the name of a species is always the name of the genus to which the species belongs, followed by the species name (also called the species epithet). In A. arvensis the genus name has been abbreviated to A. and the species has been spelled out in full. In a document that uses this abbreviation it should always be clear from the context which genus name has been abbreviated.

Some of the most common uses of A. arvensis are:

Acinos arvensis, the basil thyme
Agaricus arvensis, the horse mushroom
Alauda arvensis, the skylark, a small passerine bird species
Alchemilla arvensis, the field parsley-piert, the western lady's-mantle, the parsley breakstone
Anagallis arvensis, the scarlet pimpernel or red pimpernel, red chickweed, poorman's barometer, shepherd's weather glass
Anchusa arvensis, the small bugloss and annual bugloss
Anthemis arvensis, the corn chamomile or mayweed, scentless chamomile and field chamomile, anthémis des champs

See also
Arvensis (disambiguation)